Caecilia (minor planet designation: 297 Caecilia) is a typical Main belt asteroid. It was discovered by Auguste Charlois on 9 September 1890 in Nice.

Photometric observations during 2003 showed a rotation period of 6.163 ± 0.004 hours with a brightness variation of 0.15 in magnitude.

References

External links
 
 

Background asteroids
18900909
Caecilia
Caecilia